UFC Fight Night: Maia vs. LaFlare (also known as UFC Fight Night 62) was a mixed martial arts event held on March 21, 2015, at the Ginásio do Maracanãzinho in Rio de Janeiro, Brazil.

Background
After hosting a PPV event at the venue and some others at HSBC Arena, the event was the first Fight Night that the UFC has hosted in Rio de Janeiro.

The event was expected to be headlined by a bantamweight rematch between Urijah Faber and Raphael Assunção. However, on February 2, Assunção was forced out of the bout as his ankle, injured in mid-December 2014, was slow to heal and he was unable to resume the proper training to prepare for the fight in that time frame. The UFC also removed Faber from the card and promoted a welterweight bout between Demian Maia and Ryan LaFlare to the main event.

Matt Wiman was expected to face Leonardo Santos at the event. However, on February 11, Wiman pulled out of the bout citing a back injury and was replaced by Anthony Rocco Martin.

Josh Thomson was expected to face Gilbert Burns at the event. However, on February 26, Thomson pulled out of the fight with an undisclosed injury, while Burns remained on the card and faced promotional newcomer Alex Oliveira.

Ben Saunders was expected to face Erick Silva at the event. However, on March 6, Saunders pulled out of the bout due to an injury. He was replaced by Josh Koscheck. Koscheck had previously fought just 21 days before this event at UFC 184, losing his fight against Jake Ellenberger.

A lightweight fight between Leandro Silva and Drew Dober ended with controversy as referee Eduardo Herdy stopped the bout at 2:45 of the second round for no apparent reason, as Dober had already escaped a guillotine choke attempt. The result was met with an enormous number of complaints from several people related to mixed martial arts. Dober was paid his win bonus regardless. Although initially announcing the controversial result would stand, the Comissão Atlética Brasileira de MMA (CABMMA) – Brazilian MMA Athletic Commission – overturned Silva's win and declared the fight a no-contest on March 26.

On April 9, the CABMMA announced that Jorge de Oliveira failed a fight night drug test, testing positive for the anabolic steroid stanozolol. He was suspended for one year, retroactive to the event date.

Results

Bonus awards
The following fighters were awarded $50,000 bonuses:
Fight of the Night: None awarded
Performance of the Night: Gilbert Burns, Godofredo Pepey, Kevin Souza and Fredy Serrano

See also
List of UFC events
2015 in UFC

References

UFC Fight Night
Mixed martial arts in Brazil
2015 in mixed martial arts
2015 in Brazilian sport
International sports competitions in Rio de Janeiro (city)
March 2015 sports events in South America